

Days

Months 
The months in Shona are named after relevant events to the Shona. Things involving spiritual activities and agriculture, as well animals and fruits serve as derivatives for month names. For example, November, known as Mbudzi in Shona, means goat. This is a sacred month, many activities such as marriage, eloping, and (kurova makuva) tomb rituals are forbidden; this time is also seen as a time when most goats are pregnant. Therefore, killing goats is seen as taboo during this month. Another example would be August, known as Nyamavhuvhu, meaning the windy one, as this is the windiest month of the year.

See also
 Xhosa calendar
 Zulu calendar
 Sesotho calendar

References 

http://www.zambuko.com/mbirapage/shona_imports/pages/calendar_months.html

Specific calendars
Shona language